Summers County is a county located in the U.S. state of West Virginia. As of the 2020 census, the population was 11,959. Its county seat is Hinton. The county was created by an act of the West Virginia Legislature on February 27, 1871, from parts of Fayette, Greenbrier, Mercer and Monroe counties and named in honor of George W. Summers (1804–68).

Geography

After gaining independence from Virginia in 1863, West Virginia's counties were divided into civil townships, with the intention of encouraging local government.  This proved impractical in the heavily rural state, and in 1872 the townships were converted into magisterial districts. Summers County was initially divided into five townships: Forest Hill, Greenbrier, Green Sulphur, Jumping Branch, and Pipestem.  Forest Hill consisted of territory received from Monroe County, where it had been part of a township of the same name.  Greenbrier was also formed from territory that had been part of Monroe County.  Green Sulphur was formed from territory received from Fayette and Greenbrier Counties, while Jumping Branch and Pipestem consisted of land received from Mercer County.

As the second-last of West Virginia's counties to be created, Summers County had townships for only a year before they were converted into magisterial districts.  In 1879, Talcott District was organized from part of Greenbrier.  The six historical districts remained largely unchanged for the next century, until in the 1970s they were consolidated into three new magisterial districts: Bluestone River, Greenbrier River, and New River.

Major highways
 Interstate 64
 West Virginia Route 3
 West Virginia Route 12
 West Virginia Route 20
 West Virginia Route 107

Adjacent counties
Greenbrier County (northeast)
Monroe County (east)
Mercer County (southwest)
Raleigh County (west)
Fayette County (northwest)
Giles County, Virginia (south)

National protected areas
 Bluestone National Scenic River (part)
 New River Gorge National Park and Preserve (part)

Demographics

2000 census
As of the census of 2000, there were 12,999 people, 5,530 households, and 3,754 families residing in the county.  The population density was 36 people per square mile (14/km2).  There were 7,331 housing units at an average density of 20 per square mile (8/km2).  The racial makeup of the county was 96.57% White, 2.15% Black or African American, 0.25% Native American, 0.09% Asian, 0.04% Pacific Islander, 0.10% from other races, and 0.79% from two or more races.  0.55% of the population were Hispanic or Latino of any race.

There were 5,530 households, out of which 25.70% had children under the age of 18 living with them, 53.80% were married couples living together, 10.00% had a female householder with no husband present, and 32.10% were non-families. 29.10% of all households were made up of individuals, and 14.40% had someone living alone who was 65 years of age or older.  The average household size was 2.32 and the average family size was 2.84.

In the county, the population was spread out, with 20.50% under the age of 18, 7.50% from 18 to 24, 24.70% from 25 to 44, 27.30% from 45 to 64, and 19.90% who were 65 years of age or older.  The median age was 43 years. For every 100 females there were 95.60 males.  For every 100 females age 18 and over, there were 93.00 males.

The median income for a household in the county was $21,147, and the median income for a family was $27,251. Males had a median income of $27,485 versus $18,491 for females. The per capita income for the county was $12,419.  24.40% of the population and 20.30% of families were below the poverty line.  Out of the total population, 34.30% of those under the age of 18 and 14.50% of those 65 and older were living below the poverty line.

2010 census
As of the 2010 United States census, there were 13,927 people, 5,572 households, and 3,632 families living in the county. The racial makeup of the county was 93.0% white, 4.8% black or African American, 0.3% American Indian, 0.2% Asian, 0.4% from other races, and 1.3% from two or more races. Those of Hispanic or Latino origin made up 1.4% of the population. In terms of ancestry, 20.2% were Irish, 18.2% were German, 17.1% were English, and 10.2% were American.

Of the 5,572 households, 24.5% had children under the age of 18 living with them, 48.8% were married couples living together, 10.9% had a female householder with no husband present, 34.8% were non-families, and 30.8% of all households were made up of individuals. The average household size was 2.26 and the average family size was 2.79. The median age was 45.7 years.

The median income for a household in the county was $27,720 and the median income for a family was $39,235. Males had a median income of $27,382 versus $25,011 for females. The per capita income for the county was $15,190. About 15.6% of families and 21.6% of the population were below the poverty line, including 23.4% of those under age 18 and 18.8% of those age 65 or over.

Politics
Like most of heavily secessionist Southern West Virginia, Summers County was powerfully Democratic for the century-and-a-third following West Virginia statehood. It voted Republican only in the landslide wins of 1920, 1928 (aided by powerful anti-Catholic sentiment against Al Smith), 1972 and 1984. Like all of West Virginia there has been since 2000 a dramatic swing towards the Republican Party due to declining unionization and differences with the Democratic Party's liberal views on social issues.

Government and infrastructure

The Federal Bureau of Prisons Federal Prison Camp, Alderson is partly in unincorporated Monroe County and partly in unincorporated Summers County.

Education
Public schools in Summers County are governed by the Summers County Schools school district; per West Virginia state law, all school districts in West Virginia follow county boundaries. 1,548 students are enrolled in the five public schools in Summers County. Summers County has one public high school, Summers County High School, which serves students in grades 9–12; one middle school, Summers Middle School, which serves students in grades 5–8; and three elementary schools, Hinton Area Elementary School, serving Pre-K through 4th grades, and Jumping Branch Elementary School and Talcott Elementary School which serve students in grades Pre-K through 5. Summers County High School has a total enrollment of 458 students and a graduation rate of 78.45% Summers Middle School has an enrollment of 334 students, and Hinton Area Elementary School, Jumping Branch Elementary School, and Talcott Elementary School have enrollments of 469, 132, and 155 students respectively.

Summers County is also home to one private school, Pipestem Christian Academy. Pipestem Christian Academy is part of the West Virginia Christian Education Association and has a total enrollment of 89 students in grades Pre-K through 11. Greenbrier Academy, a therapeutic boarding school for girls, is also located in Summers County, in the community of Pence Springs.

Communities

City
Hinton (county seat)

Magisterial districts

Current
Bluestone River
Greenbrier River
New River

Historic
Forest Hill
Greenbrier
Green Sulphur
Jumping Branch
Pipestem
Talcott

Other places

Brooks
Elton
Forest Hill
Green Sulphur Springs
Hix
Indian Mills
Jumping Branch
Lowell
Marie
Nimitz
Pence Springs
Pipestem
Sandstone
Talcott
Buck

See also
 Bluestone State Park
National Register of Historic Places listings in Summers County, West Virginia

References

 
1871 establishments in West Virginia
Populated places established in 1871
Counties of Appalachia